Jerry Barrett (1824–21 January 1906) was an English painter of the Victorian era. His most notable work was the Crimean War depiction The Mission of Mercy: Nightingale receiving the wounded at Scutari (1858) which is in the National Portrait Gallery (London), paired with Queen Victoria's First Visit to her Wounded Soldiers.

There is documentation to suggest that Barrett traveled to the Crimea to obtain sketches for his pictures. Queen Victoria's First Visit to Her Wounded Soldiers was exhibited at the Royal Exhibition Gallery in Piccadilly in May, 1856, and engraved by Agnews. It was Thomas Agnew who purchased The Mission of Mercy from the artist in August 1857, and exhibited it at Leggatt and Hayward Gallery in Cornhill in the summer of 1858 at the height of the Indian Mutiny.

Works

References

External links
Jerry Barrett on Artnet
Nightingale receiving the Wounded at Scutari (National Portrait Gallery, London)

1824 births
1906 deaths
19th-century English painters
English male painters
20th-century English painters
20th-century English male artists
19th-century English male artists